The Brink of Law (Traditional Chinese: 突圍行動) is a TVB modern action series broadcast in January 2007.

Synopsis
Tong Chi-Ko (Steven Ma) is a respected lawyer and the source of his father's pride; his father dreams of seeing his son becoming a crown attorney for Hong Kong. However, his father (Ha Yu) is addicted to gambling, much to the displeasure of his wife and daughter, and ends up with a dangerous amount of debt. When the father and son spend a day watching a horse race together, Tong Chi-Ko meets Tung Yat-Tsun (Ron Ng), a veterinarian and the nephew of the head of an affluent corporation. They become good friends.

Unknown to Yat-Tsun, his uncle, Tung Chin-Long (Elliot Ngok), is involved with rigging horse races. Tung Chin-Long's wife, Sung Gam-Chi (Michelle Yim), proves to be especially dangerous in insuring the safety of her family, particularly for the future of her favoured older son Tung Yat-Long (Stephen Wong). Her younger son, Tung Yat-Chiu (Vin Choi), ends up being a selfish troublemaker and her niece, Sung Ka-Yee (Shirley Yeung), reveals herself to be manipulative, spiteful, and two-faced.

Tong Chi-Ko's father commits suicide after mistakenly believing his wife and daughter left him because he was unwilling to stop gambling and unable to get out of debt. On the same day Chi-Ko learns that he has achieved what his father had hoped to see. Things become worse when Tong Chin-Long's younger son frames Chi-Ko with possession of illegal drugs, which Yat-Chiu had originally planned to use on Chi Ko's sister, Tong Chi-Man (Yoyo Chen). Chi-Ko loses his licence to practice law, but is able to find work as a legal advisor for Nicholas, Tung Chin-Long's fashion company, with help from Yat-Tsun.

Chi Ko runs into his high school lover Tsui Wing (Bernice Liu) who had left to Canada when they were young and had not been in contact since. They start a budding relationship. Yan Heung-Ming (Kenneth Ma), a police officer, arrests Tung Chin-Long's brother-in-law for bookmarking business. Sung Gam-Chi seeks revenge for her brother by hiring an assassin to kill Ming.

One day, Tsun sees his mother at Nicolas, who had left him right after he was born. She had come to see Tung Chin-Long to get money from him to help with her new husband's financial troubles. Tsun overhears their conversation that Chin-Long had raped her while he was drunk, and that Tsun is actually his son. When Tsun's father, Tung Chin-Pang (Law Lok Lam), hears of this, he has a fierce fight with Chin-Long. Gam-Chi thinks that Tsun wants to take Chin-Long's fortune away from her dearest son Long, who had been paralyzed from a skiing accident, and hires an assassin to kill Tsun. Fearing for Tsun's safety, Chin-Pang decides to relocate to New York with him, with the excuse that he will only undergo surgery for his heart there. Chin-Long quarrels with Chin-Pang for taking his son away from him, and it triggers Chin-Pang's heart attack. Chin-Long deliberately fails to give Chin-Pang his medicine, and Chin-Pang dies. Wing and Chi-Ko break up for a period, only to get back together. Ka-Yee pretends to fall for Yat-Long so that she can take revenge for her father. Gam-Chi is half-pleased and half-unhappy.

Soon Chi-Ko finds out the true identity of Wing and is recruited by Madam Wong, to go undercover and reveal Gam-Chi and Chin-Long's suspected bookkeeping and underground firearms business.

Cast

The Tung family

The Tang family

The Yan family

Viewership ratings

Awards and nominations
40th TVB Anniversary Awards (2007)
 "Best Drama"
 "Best Actress in a Leading Role" (Michelle Yim - Sung Gam-Chi)
 "Best Actress in a Leading Role" (Shirley Yeung - Kelly Sung Ka-Yee)
 "Best Actor in a Supporting Role" (Elliot Ngok - Tung Chin-Lung)
 "Best Actor in a Supporting Role" (Law Lok Lam - Tung Chin-Pang)
 "My Favourite Female Character Role" (Shirley Yeung - Kelly Sung Ka-Yee)

References

External links
TVB.com The Brink of Law - Official Website 
K for TVB.net The Brink of Law - Episodic Synopsis and Screen Captures 

TVB dramas
2007 Hong Kong television series debuts
2007 Hong Kong television series endings